Thomas Bourchier may refer to:
 Thomas Bourchier (cardinal) (c. 1404–1486), English archbishop, Lord Chancellor and cardinal
 Sir Thomas Bourchier (died 1510), English knight, Constable of Windsor Castle, nephew of the previous
 Thomas Bourchier (Franciscan) (died 1586?), English Observantine Franciscan and martyrologist

See also 
 Claud Thomas Bourchier (1831–1877), English recipient of the Victoria Cross
 Bourchier